Our Lady of the Nile is a French-language novel by Rwanda-born writer Scholastique Mukasonga, originally published in 2012 by Éditions Gallimard. It is Mukasonga's fourth book and first novel. The English-language translation, published in the United States in 2014 by Archipelago Books, was done by Melanie Mauthier, a poet and writer from the United Kingdom.

The story is about life at a Catholic boarding secondary school in Nyambinombe District, Rwanda, circa 1980, prior to the Rwandan genocide of 1994.

Christine Rousseau of Le Monde wrote that "D'une écriture âpre et tendue, Notre-Dame du Nil dépeint une société qui chemine inexorablement vers l'horreur" ("With bitter and tense writing, Our Lady of the Nile depicts a society walking inexorably towards horror"). Brian P. Kelly of The New Criterion wrote that the book "is a snapshot of the social and racial conflicts that eventually led to the 1994 massacres." Madeleine LaRue of Music & Literature wrote that "The West has indeed too often dismissed suffering in Africa, but books like Our Lady of the Nile remind us why we must not be dismissive, why we must not look away."

In 2022, the novel was included on the "Big Jubilee Read" list of 70 books by Commonwealth authors, selected to celebrate the Platinum Jubilee of Elizabeth II.

Plot

The story takes place at an all-girls lycée at the top of a hill, near the source of the Nile River. The story is set during Hutu rule. Most of the students are children of prominent government officials. Julian Lucas describes the culture as an "East African Mean Girls. The school has a quota that limits Tutsi students to 10% of the student body. Therefore only two girls are Tutsis. The characters form an ensemble cast and are present throughout the book. Each chapter focuses on a particular girl.

The initial portion of the book discusses a geography lesson in which the teacher points to the high altitude in which the school resides, and the teacher proclaims the apparent proximity to heaven. Julian Lucas of the New York Review of Books states that this foreshadows a fall from grace. The middle of the novel includes the Tutsi students' encounters with some men, and the final portion of the novel showcases an anti-Tutsi frenzy, orchestrated by Hutu student Gloriosa and assisted by a white teacher. Gloriosa had accidentally damaged a statue of Mary while trying to remove a nose deemed too Tutsi-like, referring to the notion of spiting one's face by cutting off one's nose. Character deaths are not directly depicted and are instead recounted by another character. A northern-origin student, Goretti, ends Gloriosa's campaign and becomes the leader of the school dormitory; this is a reference to the overthrow of Grégoire Kayibanda by Juvénal Habyarimana. Gloriosa's father becomes a prison inmate.

Tom Zoellner of Chapman University argued that the beginning of the novel is "too preoccupied with stage-setting".

Style
Christopher Byrd of Barnes & Noble Review stated that the novel uses a context leading up to the Rwandan massacre while also maintaining "a universal texture to the resentment, envy, and opportunism that are a part of any student body" through being a school story. Nick DiMartino wrote in Three Percent that Mukasonga included "chuckling good humor" and was "playful" in her writing. The novel uses many Kinyarwanda words, a feature retained in the English translation; LaRue stated that many writers in post-colonial countries intersperse words of indigenous languages into texts written in European languages, which is "interrupting" the colonial language. The English version also retains usage of some French words, such as lycée, giving it what LaRue describes as "another layer of 'foreignness' to the text".

Characters

The reviewer for Publishers Weekly wrote that the characters are distinct and that a few characters "lack overt motivation for their nastiness", and LaRue argued that some characters are "too schematic".

Most of the characters are schoolgirls from wealthy families. Students include:
 Veronica and Virginia (Mutamuriza) - The school's only Tutsi students, they face danger from increased anti-Tutsi sentiment. Veronica dies during anti-Tutsi violence, raped and burned to death at Fontenaille's place by a mob organized by Gloriosa, but Virginia is the sole Tutsi to survive. Virginia survives since an old man named Rubanga tells her to talk to the ghost of the queen Nyiramavugo, who tells her which Hutu people will not harm her.
 LaRue described them as the "true protagonists" of the story. Mukasonga herself had been forced to leave her school in the 1970s. LaRue wrote that "In this respect, Virginia is something of Mukasonga’s alter ego".
 Gloriosa - Gloriosa has influence from her powerful father, a Hutu, who is a prominent official in the Rwandan government. She often threatens the Tutsi students at the school. Gloriosa lies about being attacked by Tutsis. As the novel progresses she begins to order killings, beatings, and rapes, and she begins a programme of racial persecution. Gloriosa damages the statue that the school is named after since it has Tutsi features, and she represents Hutu extremism. Byrd stated that she is a "two-dimensional demagogue", and he describes her as the "de facto villain". LaRue wrote: "If as a character she seems less complex, less interesting than her fellow students, this is likely intentional."
 Goretti - A student from northern Rwanda, her father is a military official in charge of a base. Goretti is upset that a white researcher is involved so heavily with the gorillas while nobody else is to that degree; Lucas stated that the researcher "is likely Dian Fossey". This prompts Goretti to organize her own trip. She ends Gloriosa's campaign by taking control from her.
 Frida - Frida's family works for the Rwandan state in the international relations sector. The Ambassador of Zaire courts Frida, wanting her to be his wife. He is a young man, and the two have sex in the bungalow at the school. They plan to marry, but before that happens Frida becomes pregnant. The incident causes a scandal at the school.
 Modesta - a half-Hutu, half-Tutsi girl who is Gloriosa's friend
 Immaculée - a student who has a boyfriend and wears revealing clothing

Faculty:
 Mother Superior - The head of the school
 Father Herménégilde - A chaplain who is the head of Catholic Relief Services, Lucas describes him as "Gloriosa's Pygmalion". He supports Gloriosa's anti-Tutsi stances and commits himself to the Hutu cause. Herménégilde is sexually interested in his students. He gives gifts in exchange for allowing him to see the student naked. He assists Gloriosa when she has the school raided.
 Olivier Lapointe - A hippie teacher from France
 Sister Lydwine - The geography teacher

Other characters:
 Monsieur de Fontenaille - A white artist, described by Lucas as having "failed" and being a "colonial holdover", Fontenaille lives by himself on a former coffee plantation. He believes Tutsi people were descendants of pharaohs. He takes an interest in Veronica, and he enjoys making sketches of the students. Fontenaille tells Veronica that he will help her get a European education. While Gloriosa has the school raided, Veronica is at Fontenaille's residence. He kills himself with a noose before the mob appears.
 Lucas states that Fontenaille has "a morbid enchantment" with the possible complete disappearance of Tutsis even as he has "seeming concern" for Veronica's welfare.

Reception
The book won the 2012 Prix Ahmadou-Kourouma. It also won the Prix Renaudot, the French Voices Award, and the Océans France Ô prize. Judith Rosen of Publishers Weekly ranked it as one of "The Big Indie Books of Fall 2014". In 2016, the English translation was on the shortlist for the International Dublin Literary Award.

Byrd stated that the "air of foreboding consequence that imparts urgency to almost every page" adds to the novel, and that "Mukasonga is a gifted storyteller with a sure sense of plot construction, and an aptitude for crafting piquant descriptions." Byrd criticised the use of archetypes as characters, calling them "tendentious characterizations" and Byrd also argued that the dialog "skews too much to blatant declarations for my tastes".

Rousseau wrote that the book was "Poignant et implacable" (poignant and harsh/implacable).

Tom Zoellner of Chapman University stated that the book is an "outstanding work of African fiction", and that "Mukasonga is dead on target about Rwanda". According to Zoellner, the expository speeches were "clunky" and some characters made "stentorian proclamations that no self-respecting adolescent girl would attempt" and therefore "Mukasonga’s strength is generally not in dialogue."

LaRue stated that "we should[...]welcome the opportunity to read Mukasonga’s work in English", despite its minor flaws including " dialogue and exposition[that]are occasionally clumsy".

John Taylor wrote in The Arts Fuse that Our Lady of the Nile is "well-constructed". He argued that the author used too pedagogical of an approach to explain the Hutu-Tutsi conflict but he said that was a minor complaint.

Publishers Weekly wrote that Mukasonga "fully draws readers into the tensions, spirituality, and culture of Rwandan life from page one."

Film

In 2014, Charlotte Casiraghi bought the rights to the book and will be one of the producers of the film to be adapted from the novel. "Chapter 2", the production company run by Casiraghi's partner, Dimitri Rassam released the film Our Lady of the Nile in partnership with Les Films du Tambour, run by Marie Legrand and Rani Massalha.

The film was directed by Atiq Rahimi and stars Amanda Santa Mugabekazi, Albina Sydney Kirenga, Malaika Uwamahoro, Clariella Bizimana, Belinda Rubango Simbi, and Pascal Greggory. Its world premiere is scheduled for 5 September 2019 at the Toronto International Film Festival, where the film has been designated "Contemporary World Cinema Opening Film".

See also

 Rwandan literature

References

Further reading

 Béraud-Sudreau, Caroline. "notre dame du nil, de scholastique mukasonga". Les 8 Plumes, L'Express. 9 March 2013.
 Cocquet, Marion. "Notre-Dame du Nil", mémoires de jeunes filles brisées." Le Point. 8 November 2012.
 Garcin, Jérôme. "Scholastique Mukasonga, la pharaonne noire du Calvados" (Archive). L'Obs.
 Payot, Marianne. "Notre-Dame du Nil, un Renaudot bien mérité". L'Express. 5 December 2012.
 "Notre-Dame du Nil". La Lettre de la CADE n° 159, Janvier 2013. Coordination pour l'Afrique de Demain (CADE). p. 10–11.
 "Notre-Dame du Nil" de Scholastique Mukasonga chez Gallimard (Paris, France)". 20 Minutes.

External links
 Scholastique Mukasonga Official Website 
 Our Lady of the Nile - Archipelago Books
 Notre-Dame du Nil - Éditions Gallimard 

2012 French novels
Books about Rwanda
2012 debut novels
Novels set in boarding schools
Novels set in Rwanda
Éditions Gallimard books